Rough Going is a 1925 American silent Western film directed by Wally Van and starring Franklyn Farnum. Actress Ruth Stonehouse provided the story.

It is preserved in the Library of Congress collection and at Cinematheque Royale de Belgique, Bruxelles(Brussels).

Cast
 Franklyn Farnum- Himself
 Marion Harlan - Patricia Burke
 Vester Pegg - Jim Benton
 Dora Baker - Mother Blue
 Alys Murrell - "La Rosita"
 Buck Black - Micky

References

External links
 Rough Going @ IMDb.com
 

1925 films
Films based on short fiction
1925 Western (genre) films
American black-and-white films
Silent American Western (genre) films
1920s American films
1920s English-language films